Banská Bystrica railway station serves the city and municipality of Banská Bystrica, seat of the Banská Bystrica Region, central Slovakia.

Opened in 1873, the station is a junction between the Vrútky–Zvolen railway and the Banská Bystrica–Červená Skala railway.

The station is currently owned by Železnice Slovenskej republiky (ŽSR); train services are operated by Železničná spoločnosť Slovensko (ZSSK).
Banská Bystrica railway station is situated at the southern end of 29. Augusta, on the edge of the city centre.

History
The station was opened on 3 September 1873, together with the rest of the Zvolen–Banská Bystrica section of the Vrútky–Zvolen railway. On 26 July 1884, the station became a through station, upon the inauguration of the Banská Bystrica–Brezno section of the Banská Bystrica–Červená Skala railway.

It was not until 19 December 1940 that the Banská Bystrica–Dolná Štubňa section of the Vrútky–Zvolen railway was opened, thus completing the construction of that railway, and simultaneously transforming Banská Bystrica into a junction.

Lines

170 Vrútky–Zvolen
172 Banská Bystrica–Červená Skala

See also

History of rail transport in Slovakia
Rail transport in Slovakia

References

External links

 Banská Bystrica railway station on vlaky.net 

Railway Station
Railway stations in Banská Bystrica
Railway stations in Banská Bystrica Region
Railway stations opened in 1873
Railway stations in Slovakia opened in the 19th century